Friedrich Karl Johannes Thiele (May 13, 1865 – April 17, 1918) was a German chemist and a prominent professor at several universities, including those in Munich and Strasbourg.  He developed many laboratory techniques related to isolation of organic compounds.  In 1907 he described a device for the accurate determination of melting points, since named Thiele tube after him.

Thiele was born in Ratibor, Prussia, now Racibórz, Poland. Thiele  studied mathematics at the University of Breslau but later turned to chemistry, receiving his doctorate from Halle in 1890 . He taught at the University of Munich from 1893 to 1902, when he was appointed professor of chemistry at Strasbourg.

He developed the preparation of glyoxal bis(guanylhydrazone).

After Kekulé's proposal for benzene structure in 1865, Thiele suggested a "Partial Valence Hypothesis", which concerned double and triple carbon-carbon bonds with which he explains their particular reactivity. In 1899 this led to the prediction of the resonance that existed in benzene, and he proposed a resonance structure, by using a broken circle to represent the partial bonds. Later this problem was completely solved with the advent of quantum theory.

In 1899, Thiele was head of Organic Chemistry at the Bavarian Academy of Sciences in Munich. With his associate Otto Holzinger, he synthesised an iminodibenzyl nucleus: two benzene rings attached together by a nitrogen atom and an ethylene bridge.

He discovered the condensation of ketones and aldehydes with cyclopentadiene as a route to fulvenes.  He also recognized that these deeply colored species were related to but isomeric with benzene derivatives.

According to one of his students Heinrich Otto Wieland, Thiele had a  dislike of the chemistry of natural products.

References

1865 births
1918 deaths
People from Racibórz
People from the Province of Silesia
19th-century German chemists
Academic staff of the Ludwig Maximilian University of Munich
Academic staff of the University of Strasbourg
University of Breslau alumni
University of Halle alumni
20th-century German chemists